Françoise Madeleine Hardy (born 17 January 1944) is a retired French singer, actress and songwriter. Mainly known for singing melancholic sentimental ballads, Hardy has been an important figure in French pop music since her debut, spanning a career of more than fifty years with over thirty studio albums released. She rose to prominence in the early 1960s as a leading figure of the yé-yé wave, a genre of pop music and associated youth culture phenomenon that adapted to French the pop and rock styles that came from the United States and the United Kingdom. The singer differentiated herself from her peers by writing her own material, a rare feat in an industry dominated by older, male composers and producers. France's most exportable female singer of the era, Hardy rose to international fame and released music sung in English, Italian and German, in addition to her native French. She also landed roles as a supporting actress in the films Château en Suède, Une balle au cœur and the American big-budget production Grand Prix, although she never pursued a serious acting career. In the mid-1960s, she also established herself as a pop and fashion icon with the aid of photographer Jean-Marie Périer, becoming a muse for top designers such as André Courrèges, Yves Saint Laurent and Paco Rabanne. In the English-speaking world, her trendy public image and personal style led her to become an icon for the Swinging London scene, and attracted the admiration of several famous artists. Long after the height of her career in the 1960s, Hardy remains one of the best-selling singers in French history, and continues to be regarded as an iconic and influential figure in both music and fashion. Her work has appeared on several critics' lists.

Born and raised in the 9th arrondissement of Paris, Hardy had a troubled childhood marked by the strict upbringing of her single mother and a largely absent father. As a teenager, she discovered English-language rock and roll performers including Elvis Presley and Brill Building pop acts such as Paul Anka through the radio, and decided to pursue a singing career. Hardy made her musical debut in 1962 on French label Disques Vogue and found immediate success through the hit song "Tous les garçons et les filles", which remains one of her most popular compositions. Disliking the production of her early releases, she began to record in London in 1964, which allowed her to broaden her sound with albums such as Mon amie la rose, L'amitié, La maison où j'ai grandi and Ma jeunesse fout le camp.... In the late 1960s and early 1970s, Hardy sought to assert herself as an artist, although this implied less commercial repercussion. The albums Comment te dire adieu, La question and Message personnel—released during this period—are among her most influential and critically acclaimed works. In them, Hardy began to work with more renowned songwriters such as Serge Gainsbourg, Patrick Modiano, Michel Berger and Catherine Lara. Between 1977 and 1988, she worked with producer Gabriel Yared in a string of successful albums, including Star, Musique saoûle, Gin Tonic and À suivre. Her 1988 record Décalages was widely publicized as Hardy's final album, although she returned eight years later with Le danger, which completely reinvented her sound to a harsher alternative rock. Her following albums of the 2000s—Clair-obscur, Tant de belles choses and (Parenthèses...)—saw a return to her mellow style.

As a public figure, Hardy is known for her shyness, disenchantment with celebrity life and self-deprecatory attitude—attributed to  her lifelong struggles with anxiety and insecurity. In addition to music, Hardy has developed a renowned career as an astrologer, having written extensively on the subject since the 1970s as a proponent of the "conditionalist" school of thought—outlined by Jean-Pierre Nicola—which rejects the divinatory use of the discipline. Since the 2000s, she has also worked as a writer of both fiction and non-fiction books, including a bestselling autobiography and two essays. Through these works, Hardy has been noted for her frankness in discussing her family life and health problems related to MALT lymphoma and old age, as well as her sometimes controversial political ideas. In 2006, she was awarded the Grande médaille de la chanson française honorary award given by the Académie française, in recognition of her career in music. In the 2010s, Hardy released her last three albums: La pluie sans parapluie, L'amour fou—released alongside her eponymous first novel in celebration of the 50th anniversary of her music career—and Personne d'autre—which brought her out of a previously declared retirement. She has been married to fellow French singer-songwriter Jacques Dutronc since 1981 and their only son, Thomas, is also a musician. In 2021, Hardy announced that her health had worsened and that she would not be able to sing again owing to the effects of cancer therapy.

Early life

Françoise Madeleine Hardy was born on 17 January 1944 at the Marie-Louise Clinic in the 9th arrondissement of Paris, in Nazi-occupied France during World War II. At the time of her birth, there was an air raid alert in place, with the windows of the clinic "exploding". She has related being born during this violent context with the "abnormally anxious temperament" that she developed as an adult. Her mother Madeleine Hardy, who came from an ordinary background, raised Françoise and her younger sister Michèle—born eighteen months after her—as a single parent. Her father Étienne Dillard—a married man who came from a much wealthier family—did little to help them financially and was largely an absent figure in their upbringing, only visiting the children a couple of times a year. Madeleine Hardy raised her daughters strictly, in a modest apartment on the 9th arrondissement's Rue d'Aumale street. Hardy had an unhappy and troubled childhood, and mainly engaged in solitary activities like reading, playing with dolls or listening to the radio. At the insistence of their father, the girls went to a Catholic school called Institution La Bruyère, under the tutelage of Trinitarian nuns. The gap of social origin between Hardy and her classmates was a source of permanent humiliation for her. She recalled in her autobiography: "This is most likely where the feeling of shame that has tormented me non-stop since I was a child took root. Everything fell into place: the social status of my parents who I naively believed were divorced, (...) the good sisters' constant complaints that my father was generally a year behind in his payments, and the various differences with the other girls." Her lifelong insecurities were also fuelled by her regular visits to her maternal grandmother in Aulnay-sous-Bois, who "told [her] repeatedly that [she] was unattractive and a very bad person".  Between 1952 and 1960, Hardy and her sister were sent every summer to Austria to learn German, encouraged by her mother's new lover, an Austrian baron. As her father played piano, Hardy was encouraged to receive piano lessons as a very young child, from which she quickly dropped out after experiencing stage fright when she was supposed to display her talents onstage at the Salle Gaveau.

A disciplined student, Hardy skipped two years of secondary education and passed her baccalauréat in 1960 at age sixteen. To mark the occasion, her father asked her what gift she would like and she chose a guitar, with which she began to sing her own melodies. Following her mother's orders, she enrolled in the Paris Institute of Political Studies while still a teenager. Considering it too challenging, she quickly left the institution and joined the Sorbonne to study German. Hardy used the time left from her courses to devote herself to composing songs on her guitar. She began to test her repertoire on the small stage of venue Moka Club, also known as Club des mordus, where she performed every Thursday "in front of an audience of retirees". Around this time, she auditioned for record label Pathé-Marconi after reading an ad in France-Soir. Although she was rejected, Hardy was impressed that she had held the directors' attention for longer than she expected. She also felt encouraged after hearing her recorded voice, which she found "less off-key and tremulous than [she] feared". The aspiring singer then went to Philips Records, where she was recommended to take singing lessons. Following this advice, Hardy joined Le Petit Conservatoire de la chanson in 1961, a school for radio performers—the first of its kind in France—led by singer Mireille Hartuch. Originally launched as a radio program in 1955, the Petit Conservatoire was turned into a popular TV show beginning in June 1960. When a student gave a satisfactory performance, they were given the chance to release it on the radio, or even perform it again for television. Hartuch—who was known to be very selective—accepted Hardy right away, recalling in 1966: "The first time Françoise entered the classroom to audition, I didn't know if she sang, if she played guitar, what she was doing, I just looked and felt like there was a spark, something that lit up." They developed a "mother-daughter relationship" and a long friendship based on mutual esteem.

Music career

1961–1963: Career breakthrough 

On 14 May 1961, Hardy auditioned for the French label Disques Vogue, where was received by directors Serge Goron and Léo Vidaly, who recommended that she take music theory and harmony lessons with a pianist. Her good looks impressed Vogue sound engineer André Bernot—feeling that she "would make a nice record cover"—who offered to teach her some rudiments of music theory in order to improve her sense of rhythm. Bernot later recorded a four-track demo with her, which he submitted to Jacques Wolfsohn, the most influential director at Vogue. At that time, Wolfsohn was looking for a female singer to record "Oh oh chéri", a French-language version of Bobby Lee Trammell's song "Uh Oh". After an audition in person, Wolfsohn immediately offered her a one-year contract, which she signed on 14 November 1961. Upon learning of Hardy's new record deal, Mireille Hartuch presented her student at the Petit Conservatoire TV show on 6 February 1962, in what has been described as "one of the most popular French TV extracts of all time". In a much remembered exchange, the hostess asked the young singer what the English-language "yeah! yeah!" in her lyrics meant, after she performed "La fille avec toi" on her guitar. The transliteration "yé-yé" was later popularized by sociologist Edgar Morin through an article published in Le Monde on 7 July 1963, in which he analyzed the burgeoning youth-led pop music scene. The yé-yé phenomenon was spearheaded by the massively popular radio program Salut les copains—created by Daniel Filipacchi—and a successful magazine of the same name.

Recorded in the spring, Vogue released her first extended play in May 1962, which included "Oh oh chéri" along with her own compositions "Il est parti un jour", "J'suis d'accord" and the sentimental ballad "Tous les garçons et les filles", which despite her wishes was relegated as a B-side because the label deemed it too melancholic for young audiences. On 5 June 1962, the singer proudly shared the record sleeve at the Petit Conservatoire. In early October, Hardy filmed a black-and-white music video for "Tous les garçons et les filles" directed by Pierre Badel, which aired on TV show Toute la chanson. The song was chosen at the initiative of Hardy and the show's producer André Salvet, despite Wolfsohn's reluctance to promote it. Hardy was introduced to the large majority of French people on the evening of 28 October 1962, when the clip was rebroadcast during an interlude of the televised results of the presidential election referendum. The exposure propelled the song to widespread popularity among young people—particularly teenage girls—aided by the wide airplay it received by radio stations, starting with youth-favorite Europe n° 1. "Tous les garçons et les filles" was further popularized by a Scopitone music video directed by Claude Lelouch, which shows the singer in an amusement ride alongside two girls whose skirts are lifted up by the wind.

Building on the momentum generated by the song's success, Vogue released two more EPs almost simultaneously, which were later compiled along with the first one in a debut studio album commonly known as Tous les garçons et les filles. In France, the LP format was initially viewed with skepticism, so Hardy's first series of albums were compilations of previously released four-track, 7-inch records, a format that was known as "super 45 [rpm]". Most of her full-length records were released without a title and bearing only her name on the cover, coming to be referred to by the title of their most popular song. Her debut studio album was soon awarded the Trophée de la Télévision, as well as the prestigious Grand Prix du Disque award given by the Académie Charles Cros. She later stated: "It would have made me even more happy if I had received it a little later for records better made than this." On 11 May 1962, Hardy made her debut as a live performer alongside other young singers at the Disco Revue gala in Nancy. She performed on Christmas Eve in Brussels and underwent a successful tour in Southern France from late 1962 to early 1963. By early 1963, 500,000 copies of "Tous les garçons et les filles" had been sold in France, which rose to two and a half million in the following months.

Between late 1962 and early 1963, Hardy's singles "J'suis daccord", "Le temps de l'amour" and "Tous les garçons et les filles" topped the French singles' chart. In January 1963, she graced the cover of Paris Match in a special article devoted to the "new millionaires of song" and she signed a new five-year contract with Vogue, as well as an agreement with Editions Musicales Alpha, created by Wolfsohn. In February 1963, Hardy appeared on TV show Cinq colonnes à la une alongside Sylvie Vartan and Sheila; they would go on to be considered the three biggest idols of the yé-yé era, each one embodying a different modern girl archetype. On the third of that month, she made her first performance at the prestigious Olympia concert venue in Paris, where she opened for Richard Anthony. Between 26 February and 10 April, Hardy took part in the Gala des Stars concert tour sponsored by Europe n° 1 and Salut les copains, to great success. Between two of the tour's dates, she represented Monaco at the Eurovision Song Contest in London, singing ""; she finished joint fifth with 25 points, level with France's Alain Barrière. "" reached no. 5 in the French charts in June 1963. In October, Hardy released her second studio album Le premier bonheur du jour. That month, she received the "Youth" Edison Award at the Grand Gala du Disque in Scheveningen, Netherlands. She was handed the trophy by author Godfried Bomans, who praised her as a "creative artist" that knew how to impose "a personal style without trying to imitate the Americans". Between 7 November and 18 December 1963, Hardy once again performed as Anthony's opening act at the Olympia and was well received by the press, who had hitherto criticized her stiff live performances.

As a leading figure of the yé-yé craze, Hardy found herself at the forefront of the French music scene and became the country's most exportable female singer. Beginning in 1963, translated re-recordings of "Tous les garçons et les filles" began to be exported to Italian, German and English-speaking markets. The first foreign-language country where the singer found success was Italy, where the song became "Quelli della mia età" and sold 255,000 copies, topping the singles' chart between April and October and dropping to second place between July and August, behind Rita Pavone's "Cuore". At the end of the summer, she recorded new songs in Milan, which were included in the Italian release Françoise Hardy canta per voi in italiano. The single "L'età dell'amore" / "E all'amore che penso" also topped the Italian charts. On 11 October, Hardy performed in Barcelona, Spain, as part of the fourth Great Gala of the Sedería Española. In November 1963, she embarked on her first Italian tour, which mostly visited small coastal towns. The singer was also successful in Portugal and travelled to Lisbon in late 1963 to appear in several TV shows.

1964–1968: International stardom

At the peak of the British Invasion phenomenon, Hardy sought to modernize her music, opting to leave the poor quality of French studios and sound engineers to go record her songs at Pye Records' studios in London. Working with producer Tony Hatch in February 1964, she recorded an EP that included a cover of "Catch a Falling Star" and three adaptations of her hits: "Find Me a Boy" ("Tous les garçons et les filles"), "Only Friends" ("Ton meilleur ami") and "I Wish It Were Me" ("J'aurais voulu"). On 21 February, she promoted "Catch a Falling Star" on TV show Ready Steady Go! English audiences initially preferred her recordings in French, with "Tous les garçons et les filles" entering the UK Singles Chart on 1 July 1964 at number thirty-six.

Her 1965 English-language single "All Over the World" was a substantial hit in the United Kingdom, reaching the Top 20 and staying in the charts for fifteen weeks. It was also successful in South Africa, Australia and New Zealand, probably being her most popular recording among English-speaking audiences. She promoted the song with performances on the British TV shows Ready Steady Go!, Ollie and Fred's Five O'Clock Club, Thank Your Lucky Stars and Top of the Pops.

In 1965, Hardy flew to New York City to sign a record deal with Kapp, allowing them to distribute her records in the United States. The label released her debut studio album under the title The "Yeh-Yeh" Girl From Paris!, as well as the single "However Much"—an English-language version of the previously released track "Et même..." While in the United States, Hardy made her first appearance in American television in NBC's program Hullabaloo, where she performed "However Much", a bilingual version of Charles Trenet's "Que reste-t-il de nos amours ?" and a rendition of "The Girl from Ipanema".

The singer became famous overnight in Germany after her 28 April 1965 appearance on TV show Portrait in Musik, in a series of staged musical performances directed by Truck Branss. Shortly after, the album In Deutschland was released, which, in addition to containing translated versions of her previous songs, included five original compositions. Her most popular track in Germany was "Frag' den Abendwind", which remained in the national singles' chart for twenty-four weeks.

Pressured by her French and Italian record companies, Hardy took part in the Sanremo Music Festival 1966, where she reached the finals with the Edoardo Vianello-penned song "Parlami di te".

On 12 April 1966, Hardy was among the forty-six performers that took part in the famous group photograph shot by Jean-Marie Périer for Salut Les Copains, which became a symbol of the yé-yé era and came to be known in France as the "photo of the century" (French: "photo du siècle").

Beginning in late 1967, Hardy began to release her records under her own production company Asparagus, although Vogue continued to distribute them. She later regretted this decision, recalling in 1999: "Wolfsohn had sensed that the singers were going to want to be more and more independent. So it was he himself who suggested that I create a production house. At first I was very seduced, then I realized that it was a trap: the CEO of Vogue, Léon Cabat, was also in this production company and, between them, owned the majority of the shares. This has given rise to a lot of harassment, lawsuits." Her seventh French studio album Ma jeunesse fout le camp...—the first one produced under Asparagus—was released in November 1967.

Hardy gave her last three live performances in Kinshasa, Congo during June 1967.

On the advice of English producer Noel Rodgers, Hardy recorded her second English-language album in the spring of 1968, known variously as En anglais, The Second English Album, Will You Love Me Tomorrow and Loving, depending on the country.

1969–1976: Transition to artistic maturity

In the late 1960s and early 1970s, Hardy sought to assert herself as an artist, although this implied less commercial repercussion than that which she had achieved with Disques Vogue. In 1970, the singer definitively broke up with the label and signed a three-year contract with Sonopresse, a subsidiary of Hachette. She also created a new production company—called Hypopotam—and founded her own music publishing company—Kundalini. Hardy received high advances from Sonopresse, which allowed her to finance her own projects. She has described this period as "the happiest time", as she was now able to work independently on her music endeavours. This transitional period in her career was kicked off by the 1970 publication of several compilation albums—including the French release Françoise—as well as the studio albums One-Nine-Seven-Zero—recorded in English—and Träume, her last German-language release.

Her first French studio album produced under Hypopotam was Soleil, released in the spring of 1970. It featured a wide array of arrangers, including Bernard Estardy, Jean-Claude Vannier, Jean-Pierre Sabar, Mick Jones, Saint-Preux, Simon Napier-Bell and Tommy Brown from Nero and the Gladiators. In the summer of 1970, Hardy released her penultimate Italian-language single "Lungo il mare", written by Giuseppe Torrebruno, Luigi Albertelli and Donato Renzetti. Neither this one nor the next Italian single—which included translated versions of "Soleil" ("Sole ti amo") and "Le crabe" ("Il granchio")—obtained success. She also recorded in Spanish for the first time, in a single that contained translated versions of "Soleil" ("Sol") and "J'ai coupé le téléphone" ("Corté el teléfono"). In the spring of 1971, Hardy released the Patrick Dewaere-penned single "T'es pas poli", reaching out to the singer-songwriter after being impressed with his performances at the Café de la Gare in Paris. To promote the song, Dewaere and the singer performed it on several television shows. Despite counting on Hardy's fame, the record did not sell as anticipated.

In the early 1970s, Hardy met Tuca—pseudonym of Valeniza Zagni da Silva—a Brazilian singer and guitarist based in Paris, and they soon became close friends. After attending the Festival Internacional da Canção in Rio de Janeiro—and having come into contact with the music of Brazil—Hardy decided to make an album with the Brazilian musician in late 1970. It was the first time in the singer's career that she was able to work with a songwriter on songs before entering the recording studio, in addition to participating in the choice of string arrangements. The resulting album, La question, was released on 16 October 1971, promoted through the singles "Le martien", "Même sous la pluie" and "Rêve". Although it was highly acclaimed by the French press upon release, the album sold poorly in comparison to other works by the singer, as it received little promotion on television, and failed to gain traction on radio stations and among audiences at the time. Nevertheless, La question has generated a dedicated cult following since its release and is regarded as Hardy's artistic peak. The singer reflected in 2008:
I have never been as proud of one of my records as I was of [La question]. (...) This album seems to me to be more homogenous, "classier," and sophisticated than my previous efforts, and while it did not enjoy great success with the public at large, at least I can claim that it did touch another audience. (...) Often an ambitious record can be more or less ignored when it is released but ends up having a long life. The sole concern, and it is a valid one, is that some of the artists who played on it were in no position to wait twenty years to feed themselves. I became increasingly concerned about this situation as time passed, even though creating songs remains a very particular life choice, one that involves accepting natural selection and precarious employment.
Following the poor commercial performance of La question, Hardy decided to move towards a different sound and enlisted British arranger Tony Cox to produce her following album. Known as Et si je m'en vais avant toi, L'éclairage or "the orange album"—in reference to its cover—the record was released in November 1972 and promoted through the single "La berlue", released in June. Immediately after finishing Et si je m'en vais avant toi, Hardy and Cox recorded the English-language release If You Listen, which included cover versions of several little-known American and British songs. Hardy's Sonopresse period, which had started off well thanks to the success of Comment te dire adieu? and Soleil, ended on a sour note with the commercial failure of La question, Et si je m'en vais avant toi and If You Listen—which she nevertheless considered her "best [albums] by far". After her contract expired, the record label decided not to renew it. The singer was relatively unbothered by the poor sales, feeling that she had been artistically vindicated with these records.

Around 1972, Hardy contacted songwriter and producer Michel Berger with the intention of working with him, after being impressed by his work with Véronique Sanson. Berger agreed to produce and arrange her following album, but was unable to write all of its music owing to other obligations. He wrote two of the record's twelve songs—"Message personnel" and "Première rencontre"—and took the responsibility for finding the other ten immediately after, which Hardy felt were subpar in comparison. Following a period of artistic independence, the singer again found herself working under the hectic schedule of a demanding producer. She later described Berger as "a man in a hurry, with a thousand things to do, a thousand things to think about, a thousand people to see". The album's recording sessions took place in July 1973, soon after Hardy had given birth to her son Thomas Dutronc. Message personnel was released that year on Warner Bros. Records— with whom Hardy signed a three-year contract— and was greeted with commercial and critical success. Its title track was a big commercial success in France that reignited the singer's career. She promoted the project with appearances on several French TV shows, including Dimanche Salvador, Sports en fête, Top à, La Une est à vous, Midi trente, Minuit chez vous, Tempo, Averty's Follies and Domino.

For her following project, Hardy wrote ten songs that revolved around a common, underlying story. To put the words into music, she mainly relied on her friend Catherine Lara, also working with Jean-Pierre Castelain and Gérard Kawczynski (with whom she had worked in Message personnel), André Georget and Michel Sivy. Produced by Hughes de Courson, the concept album Entr'acte was released in November 1974 and promoted through the songs "Ce soir", "Je te cherche" and "Il y a eu des nuits". It was a commercial failure. The singer then decided to stay away from music and devote more time to raising her child, releasing only two singles between 1975 and 1976. The first one was the Jean-Michel Jarre-penned "Que vas-tu faire?"—backed by "Le compte a rebours"— which sold poorly. The second one was "Femme parmi les femmes", the main theme of Claude Lelouch's film Si c'était à refaire, featuring lyrics by Pierre Barouh and music by Francis Lai.

Around 1976, Berger recontacted Hardy with the intention of signing her to his new record label Apache and she sent him the songs "Ton enfance", "Star" and "L'impasse". However, Berger was keen on releasing an album with compositions structured around a unifying concept, so she gave up the idea of joining the label. She finally signed a three-year contract with Pathé-Marconi.

1977–1995: Work with Gabriel Yared and hiatus

For 1977's Star, her first album released under Pathé-Marconi, Hardy enlisted Gabriel Yared as a producer and arranger. The "patchwork album" includes six tracks written by Hardy, along with songs written by Serge Gainsbourg, William Sheller, Catherine Lara, Luc Plamondon, Roland Vincent and Michel Jonasz. At first, their relationship was tense, and Star was recorded under a "strained atmosphere", which earned her the nickname "ice queen". According to Frédéric Quinonero, "the singer deemed it necessary to immediately dispel any misunderstanding, physical or sentimental, before being integrating into a faithful friendship." Star was a commercial success that put the singer back into the media spotlight, introducing her work to a new generation of young people. Despite their stiff relationship in the recording studio, Hardy and Yared would continue to work together for nearly six years and record five albums. In 1991, the singer recalled her work with the producer:
Gabriel [Yared] is demanding, rigorous and, consequently, disturbing, destabilizing, in work as in friendship. He had great influence over me. The five albums we made together were not easy, there were even tensions on the verge of breaking up, but I consider that it was one of the great chances of my life to find myself again under the guidance of a musician of this dimension.

Her 1978 follow-up Musique saoûle included compositions by Yared, Alain Goldstein and Michel Jonasz. The album changed Hardy's musical direction to a more danceable sound with commercial success, aided by the popularity of lead single "J'écoute de la musique saoule", especially its extended remix version. It was promoted through intensive televised appearances, which showed the singer "awkwardly" performing the track among a dancing crowd. Fueled by the popularity of "J'écoute de la musique saoule" with young people, Yared and collaborator Bernard Ilous worked on her following 1980 album Gin Tonic with an even more commercial approach. Its album cover attempted to present a "furiously modern" image of the singer and was photographed by a collaborator from Façade, a French magazine modelled after Andy Warhol's journal Influence. Gin Tonic was promoted through singles "Jazzy rétro Satanas" and "Juke-box", with only the former achieving modest commercial success. Despite reduced sales and mixed reviews, the singer's respectability remained intact and she was invited as a distinguished guest in Maritie and Gilbert Carpentier's TV show Numéro Un in 1980. Hardy's following album À suivre was released in April 1981 on label Flarenasch, in breach of contract with Pathé-Marconi. It featured a new array of collaborators—presumably because of her dissatisfaction with her previous songs—with Yared enlisting composers Louis Chedid, Pierre Groscolas, Jean-Claude Vannier, Michel Bernholc, Daniel Perreau, Jean-Pierre Bourtayre and Étienne Roda-Gil. À suivre was promoted through singles "Tamalou" and "Villégiature", with only the former achieving commercial success.

The album Quelqu'un qui s'en va was released in the spring of 1981 and featured an album cover photographed by Serge Gainsbourg.

Décalages was released on 2 May 1988. Promoted as Hardy's final album, it was a commercial success and was certified gold for selling a hundred thousand copies.

In 1990, the singer wrote the song "Fais-moi une place" for Julien Clerc, which was included in his album of the same name.

Hardy resumed her music career in the 1990s, signing a contract with Virgin Records in December 1994.

In 1995, Hardy collaborated with English band Blur in the French version of "To the End", recorded at Abbey Road Studios. It was included as a B-side to their single "Country House".

1996—2021: Final albums and retirement
In 1997, Hardy collaborated with French duo Air in the track "Jeanne", which was included as a B-side to their maxi single "Sexy Boy".

In 2000, her album Clair-obscur received the Grand Prize awarded by the Société des auteurs, compositeurs et éditeurs de musique.

In 2005, Hardy received the Female Artist of the Year award for her album Tant de belles choses at the Victoires de la Musique.

In 2006, Hardy received the Grande médaille de la chanson française award given by the Académie Française, in recognition of her music career.

In 2012, Hardy celebrated her 50th anniversary in music with the release of her first novel and an album that shared the title L'Amour fou. Diagnosed with laryngeal cancer, the singer declared it her last album but nevertheless returned nearly five years later with the 2018 release of Personne d'autre.

In March 2021, Hardy announced that she could not sing anymore as a consequence of cancer treatments.

Acting career

Although journalists often take note of Hardy's film roles, she never embarked on a serious career as an actress nor wished to do so. Although reluctant, she accepted several acting roles she was offered in the 1960s on the advice of Jean-Marie Périer. The singer recalled: "I couldn't see how I could turn down offers by well-known film directors. However, I far preferred music to cinema. Music and chanson allow you to go deep into yourself and how you feel, while cinema is about playing a part, playing a character who might be miles away from who you are."  In 1963, Hardy made her film debut playing the role of Ophelia in Roger Vadim's Château en Suède. Before casting her, Vadim tested Hardy's abilities as an actress by directing her in a reading of Cécile de Roggendorf's love letters to Giacomo Casanova for radio Europe n° 1. She did not get along well with the director during the making of Château en Suède, who mocked her for her "infinite apathy", and the shooting of the film marked the "beginning of her dread for filming sessions and the movie business in general". In promotion of the film, Hardy attended the Cannes Film Festival, where she wore a black coat by Pierre Cardin.

After a cameo in What's New Pussycat?, Hardy landed a role in Jean-Daniel Pollet's 1966 film Une balle au cœur, which was filmed on location in a remote Greek island. Her experience was also unsatisfactory, recalling: "I felt like I was at the other end of the world and my morale sank below zero when, after a day or two, I realized that the director was hopelessly bad and his film was a disaster." Building on her music career success in Italy, Hardy also made appearances as a performer in musicarelli films, including I ragazzi dell'Hully Gully (1964), Questo pazzo, pazzo mondo della canzone (1965), Altissima pressione (1965) and Europa canta (1965). She also appeared in the 1968 television special Monte Carlo: C'est La Rose, hosted by Grace Kelly.

In the mid-1960s, American director John Frankenheimer spotted Hardy as she was leaving a London club and thought she would be perfect as one of the characters in Grand Prix, a film he was developing about Formula One auto racing. Despite remaining disinterested in an acting career, Hardy agreed because the film's big-budget production offered her a large remuneration. The singer made a notable cameo in Jean-Luc Godard's 1966 film Masculin féminin, wearing a head-to-toe look by André Courrèges, including his famous white boots. In 1969, she starred in the television film L'homme qui venait du Cher alongside Eddy Mitchell. In the 1970s, she made brief appearances in Jean-Claude Lord's The Doves (Les Colombes) in 1972 and Claude Lelouch's If I Had to Do It All Over Again (Si c'était à refaire) in 1976.

Astrological career
In addition to music, Hardy has developed a career as an astrologer, having written extensively on the subject. She aligns herself with the so-called "conditionalist" school of thought—outlined by Jean-Pierre Nicola in his 1964 book La condition solaire—which puts forward a non-divinatory character of the discipline and considers that it should be used taking into account other factors such as hereditary, educational and socio-cultural determinants. Hardy has written about her distrust of most astrologers and of "predictive astrology", explaining:
... I believe this human science is restricted to offering information on one of the many factors that conditions our lives—the one connected with the rhythms of our solar system. It simply allows us to get our bearings and identify as best we can the various phases of our development, which are dependent on many more factors than just planetary cycles and configurations, and does not necessarily translate into terms of particular events and outcomes.
Hardy first became interested in the practice after consulting astrologer André Barbault in the mid-1960s. She took public courses, learned to draw up a birth chart and read many specialized books before meeting Catherine Aubier, who recommended her professor to Hardy. Hardy was then taught traditional astrology for two years by Madame Godefroy in Paris. She became more dedicated to astrology after meeting Nicola in late 1974, who contacted her to be part of a new magazine he was developing. The singer has described Nicola as "the best astrologer in the world" and wrote: "[he] initiated me into an intelligent understanding of astrology and trained me to use it, by his side, to the best of my ability." Besides astrology, Hardy was initiated into the reading of the Tarot of Marseilles by Alejandro Jodorowsky. As a complement to her astrological knowledge, she also took courses with graphologist Germaine Tripier, the dean of the French Society of Graphology.

Between recordings of her album Gin Tonic in 1979, Hardy was asked by Nicola to collaborate on a collection on the zodiac signs launched by Tchou Editions, being tasked with writing the book dedicated to Virgo. Since she had no time to write the book by herself, she shared her work with fellow astrologer Béatrice Guénin. She also collaborated with magazine Quinze Ans. In late 1980, Hardy was contacted by Pierre Lescure of the RMC radio station to entrust her with the daily horoscope as well as a weekly show, and she asked Nicola to help her so as to aid him financially. In 1982, Hardy began a new weekly broadcast titled Entre les lignes, entre les signes, in which she interviewed a film or music figure using their birth chart, while graphologist Anne-Marie Simmond—whose courses she had taken as well—drew up their psychological portrait using their handwriting. The duo also wrote a book under the same title that compiled the interviews and profiles of the show's guests, first published by RMC in 1986.

In 1990, Hardy continued her astrological work by writing articles in Swiss newspaper Le Matin and by hosting a weekly section in Thierry Ardisson's program Télé Zèbre on Antenne 2. On 7 May 2003, Hardy released Les rythmes du zodiaque, which she conceived as "a book that would allow me to make my little contribution to modern astrology". The making of the book was a laborious and stressful process that took Hardy over two years to write.

Writing career 

In addition to writing about astrology, Hardy has developed as an author of both fiction and non-fiction. Her autobiography Le désespoir des singes... et autres bagatelles was released on 9 October 2008 and became a bestseller in France, with 250,000 copies. The book was translated and published in Spanish by the San Sebastián-based independent publisher Expediciones Polares in 2017. In 2018, the English-language edition of the book was released by Feral House, titled The Despair of Monkeys and Other Trifles and translated by Jon E. Graham.

In 2012, Hardy published her first novel L'amour fou on Éditions Albin Michel, released in conjunction with a musical album of the same title. Hardy began working on its story, which deals with an obsessive romantic relationship, thirty years before its publication. Hardy had shelved the text and had no intention of releasing it, but was urged by her editor to do so and agreed after the encouragement of friend Jean-Marie Périer. The singer felt that it was appropriate to publish the book to mark the occasion of her fifty years of music career, as it was "the story that has been the matrix of almost all of my lyrics from the start". In 2013, the Italian-language edition of the novel was released by Florence's Edizioni Clichy.
 
Following the poor sales of albums La pluie sans parapluie and L'Amour fou, Hardy decided to momentarily distance herself from music and dedicate herself to writing. This resulted in the essay Avis non autorisés—released in 2015 on Éditions des Équateurs—in which she expresses the difficulties of reaching her old age. In the book Hardy also shares her views on current affairs, which have been deemed "politically incorrect". Avis non autorisés was a commercial success. A year later, she published Un cadeau du ciel, a book in which she reflects on her hospitalization in March 2015 for cancer, during which she nearly died. In the early 2020s, after being unable to continue singing—claiming she had "nothing else to do"—Hardy dedicated herself to the making of the song book Chansons sur toi et nous—published in 2021 on Éditions des Équateurs—which compiles all of her lyrics and contains commentary on them.

Artistry

Musical style

Although Hardy's music has covered a wide range of genres, she has maintained a signature sound since the beginning of her career, which is defined by her breathy alto vocals and predilection for melancholic songs. Rock & Folks Basile Farkas has dubbed her the "queen of melancholy", and the singer herself stated in 2012: "In music, I like above all the slow, sad melodies, that stir the knife in the wound. Not in a way that plunges, but in a way that uplifts. Because it feels good that the pains of feelings turn into something beautiful: a beautiful text, a beautiful melody. I still aspire to find the heartbreaking melody that will bring tears to my eyes. A melody whose quality gives it a sacred dimension." Cosette Schulz of Exclaim! described the singer as a "master of crafting simple but stellar tracks". Writers have likened Hardy's music to that of English singer Marianne Faithfull. Comparing both singers, The Guardians Keith Altham wrote in 2014: "They both sing sad songs with a simple folksy style. They both have the same shy, wistful, almost waif-like appeal about them. They both have a dramatic, 'all-alone' quality about their voices which commands sympathy and attention." Her deadpan delivery, characterized by its "cool, aloof air", has also been compared to that of German singer Nico. The recurring themes of her lyrics are sadness, personal pain, heartache, one-sided love, sleeplessness, boredom, loneliness and confinement.

Hardy is known for her demanding attitude towards her music—such as her decision to leave low-quality French studios to go record in London during the mid-1960s—something that set her apart from her French compatriots. As she matured, Hardy honed her own despairing songwriting, but also chose with alacrity the works on offer from leading professionals.  Producer Erick Benzi recalled: "From when she was 18, she knew she was different. She was capable of going in front of big artists like Charles Aznavour and saying, 'Your song is crap, I don't want to sing it.' She never made compromises." Tony Cox recalled his experience working with Hardy: "Françoise was good in that she liked things to be slightly more adventurous than the norm. There was a bit of the Left Bank about her – she’s not your average pop singer, that’s for sure." She is also known for her disapproving views towards her skills as a singer and musician, telling Rock & Folk in 2018: "I'm not a musician, that's it. By stopping to compose, I went towards ease, but also towards realism. I understood that even if I did learn things, I would never be able to do as well as real melodists. That's why I thought it was best to bring in musicians whose work touched me."

Development

1962—1967

Most of Hardy's musical output took place in the 1960s and is thus the one that attracts the most attention by music journalists. She told The Independent in 1996: "Most people don't really know me artistically. The proof is always having to talk about the Sixties and the Beatles." Her earliest musical tastes were French chanson singers—including Cora Vaucaire, Georges Guétary, Charles Trenet and Jacques Brel—since in the 1950s it was the only music played on the radio. She has expressed that Trenet "touches [her] more than the others because his music is sad and light". Hardy was also a big fan of singer and songwriter Barbara, who inspired her to write her own compositions. In the early 1960s, she was introduced to English-language rock and roll and Brill Building pop through Radio Luxembourg, receiving inspiration from artists such as Brenda Lee, the Everly Brothers, the Shadows, Cliff Richard, Neil Sedaka, Connie Francis, and especially, Elvis Presley and Paul Anka. Hardy felt "completely spellbound" by these foreign young artists and began to sing and play the guitar to try to imitate them. She recalled in 2008: "I immediately identified with them, because they expressed teenage loneliness and awkwardness over melodies that were much more inspiring than their texts". Although she is regarded as one of the greatest exponents of the yé-yé pop phenomenon of the early-to-mid 1960s, she was set apart from her peers by writing much of her own material, which allowed her songs to be "devoid of older, male sexualization or control, a privilege not many others of her era enjoyed." She also distanced herself from the other yé-yé singers by "eschewing the easy road of sunny, good girl pop". According to Jean-Marie Périer: "She was the opposite of all the French new artists trying to look and sound American. And her melodies were sad, she didn't try to make them dance the twist." Aside from original compositions, much of her 1960s repertoire consisted of versions of foreign artists that spanned a wide range of styles, including American girl-groups, early rockabilly, pre-Beatles British rock and roll, country music, folk, folk-rock and, to a lesser extent, doo-wop and soul.

Her rockabilly-tinged full-length debut Tous les garçons et les filles is the closest she was to the yé-yé genre and its noted for its simplicity, featuring minimalist accompaniment of acoustic and electric guitar, bass and jazz-influenced percussion. Robert Ham of Paste felt that the album "reveals a musician that had yet to fully absorb her influences and make them her own." Russell Warfield of Drowned in Sound felt that "her first record sticks out like a sore thumb" and described it as "the product of a patriarchal music industry", as Hardy was untrusted to shape her own material. Considered an artistic growth, her sophomore record Le premier bonheur du jour incorporated more complex instrumentation and lyricism, including electric organs and "weeping" string arrangements. It includes compositions inspired by jazz music, as well as American girl groups such as the Crystals and the Ronettes. Despite their enduring popularity, Hardy is highly critical of her first releases. She told Clash in 2018: "From very early on I felt very frustrated because I wanted to have beautiful electric guitars like those of the Shadows in the sixties or those of Cigarettes After Sex now. Instead, I had very bad French musicians and a terribly bad musical production. My albums began to improve when I went to London to record them. My first songs were not very interesting either."

Beginning in the mid-1960s, her music became lusher and richer, as she eschewed the poor quality of French studios in 1964 to go record in London with arranger Charles Blackwell, who allowed her to "reach new levels of sophistication." She told The Guardian in 2018: "I was happy from that moment. I was free to make another kind of music, not this mechanical music I had been trapped in." Hardy's music during the second half of the decade incorporated influences from the British Invasion pop phenomenon and "a strong comeback of the traditional values of French chanson, neither yé-yé nor 'Left Bank', but rather romantic." Released that year, Mon amie la rose showcased a growing complexity in her music, with stronger vocals and increased experimentation in song structure. Her most varied album yet, it incorporated influences of Phil Spector's Wall of Sound technique, as well as Italian composer Ennio Morricone. Her 1965 and 1966 output showcased a stylistic maturation, with productions that "moved from the tinny sound of yeh-yeh pop into a fuller brand of rock arrangements." The overall sound of her follow-up L'amitié is considerably more expansive. According to Pitchfork's Hazel Cills: "It wasn’t until her fifth record La maison où j'ai grandi that Hardy grew into a more grown-up, baroque sound, one that matched the depth of her sorrow and its complexities." Likewise, Warfield considered that it was the album in which "she really settles into her sound, giving us a glimpse of the performer we can still recognise as a 70-year-old". With Ma jeunesse fout le camp, her last 1960s album recorded in London, she "moved toward a more adult, sedate form of orchestrated pop balladry". It has been described as "her farewell to the yé-yé years".

1968—1974

Her return to French recording studios, 1968's Comment te dire adieu is more MOR-oriented than her previous releases. Richie Unterberger considered its music to be "perhaps even sadder and more sentimental than was the norm for Françoise". As the yé-yé era faded away following the May 68 protests, Hardy "smartly reinvented herself as an elusive folk rock jazz chanteuse" with her early 1970s releases. The singer looked for a more mature and less-pop oriented style in an effort to reflect her inner self to a greater extent. Described as "the first truly personal Françoise Hardy record", the 1971 album La question is regarded as an important turning point in her career, moving towards a less commercial sound with no apparent hooks. It is one of her "most sparsely produced efforts," with subdued and acoustic-flavored arrangements that feature guitar, touches of bass, and subtle orchestration. Through the work of Brazilian guitarist and arranger Tuca, the album incorporates marked influences of bossa nova music. Her vocals have been called "sultry" and "breathy", at times "[substituting] melodic humming in the place of singing, wordlessly articulating the emotional essence of the song." La question also marked the first time that Hardy had a part in choosing the string arrangements of her work.

Following the poor commercial performance of La question, Hardy leaned towards a more folk and rock-influenced sound. Around this time, she became an admirer of then little-known English folk singer-songwriter Nick Drake and championed his work in interviews. She recalled:  "For me, he didn't belong to a particularly British tradition: his style was quite different from that of The Beatles, the Stones and other groups that I was listening to a lot around this time. It is the soul which comes out of his songs that touched me deeply – romantic, poetic... but also the refined melodies. As well as the very individual timbre of his voice, which adds to the melancholy of the whole thing." According to Tom Pinnock: "There are certainly analogues with Nick Drake, in their personalities, voices and even a similar taste in chords and harmony." This led Joe Boyd to propose that the English musician write an album of songs for her, which would be produced by Tony Cox. Although Drake and Hardy met several times, including a visit to her recording sessions in London, the project was never carried out. Nevertheless, Cox was keen to work with Hardy regardless and, in late 1971, they recorded If You Listen, which featured a "crack team" of British folk-rock musicians. Influenced by Drake, the album showcases Hardy's taste for this musical style at the time, featuring "cinematic" arrangements that emphasize the acoustic guitar and light strings. The same year, she released Et si je m'en vais avant toi, also known as "the orange album" in reference to its cover, which incorporated influences from American blues, folk and rock music. The album features a slightly humorous tone and catchier rhythms, which were atypical for the singer.

In 1972, Véronique Sanson's debut album made a great impact on Hardy, who began to feel her own music was "very outdated". She described her impression of Sanson in her autobiography: "The originality and quality of the melodies, the lyrics, the production, and the singing made all other French singers, starting with me, seem like hasbeens. (...) It was as if the English and American influences that yé-yé had been happy to simply copy with varying degrees of success had been thoroughly digested and allowed for the emergence of something much more musically mature, as well as more personal." Hardy thus enlisted Michel Berger, the producer of Sanson's album, to oversee the production of her 1973 album Message personnel, which features arrangements by Michel Bernholc, who directed "a basic rock band backed by a lush set of strings [underlining] Hardy's wispy yet compelling vocals." The album is characterized by its sad, introspective mood and "classy, adult tone". The 1974 release Entr'acte was Hardy's first attempt at a concept album, with lyrics that narrate "the successive phases of a one-night stand between a stranger and a young woman, who, abandoned by the man she loves, is looking to give him a taste of his own medicine." It featured orchestral arrangements by Del Newman, who had recently worked on Elton John's Goodbye Yellow Brick Road and Cat Stevens' Tea for the Tillerman.

1975—2018
A jazz-oriented pop record, 1977's Star was Hardy's first album arranged by Gabriel Yared, who would produce her output for the next ten years. In 1978, as disco dominated the music industry, his team sought to adapt her sound to the era with the release of Musique saoûle, which incorporated a marked binary rhythm influenced by funk music. The singer later stated that she felt uncomfortable and embarrassed when singing over danceable rhythms. The 1988 album Décalages is noted for its layered, atmospheric sound. It incorporated the use of a Synclavier synthesizer, despite the singer's wishes to avoid fashionable digital sounds in favor of an acoustic album.

Deeply inspired by the alternative rock scene, Hardy veered into an assertive, guitar-oriented modern rock style with Le danger, her first album in seven years. She incorporated influences from English band Portishead, and the grunge, Britpop and roots rock genres. Pitchfork's Jazz Monroe described its music as "adult-contemporary space rock". The album's harsh sound and lyrics reflect the "very dark" period that the singer was living in her personal life at that time. The commercial failure of Le danger, among other reasons, caused Hardy to return to her characteristic soft and light style in her following album Clair-obscur, released in 2000. Her last five albums are characterized by their elegant and melancholic sound. 2006's (Parenthèses...) is a collection of twelve duets with a production that "[keeps] tricks and mixing slick-ery to a tasteful minimum," drawing comparisons to previous uncluttered releases such as La question. Compared to previous albums, 2010's La pluie sans parapluie features a "sunnier" sound, with a few of its songs being driven by a typical rhythm track of drums and bass, rather than by piano or strings. Her 2012 album L'amour fou features half-sung, half-spoken vocals and is characterized by its "resigned, philosophical" mood. Hardy is backed by "classy" pianos, minor chords and brushed drums. The lyrics of her last album Personne d'autre, released in 2018, deal with her advancing years in repose and her own mortality, having survived a major health crisis after the release of her previous record. Her vocals in the album show the wear and tear resulting from her illness. The dark lyrical subject matter of Personne d'autre is contrasted with the singer's characteristic delicate and intimate sound.

Public image and impact

As a public figure, Hardy is renowned for her shyness and reservedness, and observers have emphasized her "anti-social nature as a celebrity". She has been open in her autobiography and in interviews about her struggles with anxiety, self-doubt, loneliness and inferiority complex. Uncuts Tom Pinnock noted that "it was her refusal to play the showbusiness game that made her something of an icon." The singer's sudden celebrity status was a source of great discomfort for her, as she claimed in 2011: "I didn't enjoy at all everything, the trappings, when all of a sudden you become very famous. (...) [Being taken up by fashion houses] was work, things I had to do, a chore—I didn't enjoy it at all... It is quite impossible to stand—to be admired too much—it is not a normal situation. I don't like that at all. I am not comfortable with my professional life really, so the word 'icon'—it's as though you were talking about someone else, it's not me really." She regularly suffered from stage fright, which led to her stopping performing live altogether in 1968. Her public image and style during the 1960s made an impact on international pop culture, something that overshadowed her skills as a singer outside of France. As Hardy's almost exclusive photographer and agent during the decade, Jean-Marie Périer became a Pygmalion-like figure for her, transforming the singer's public image from "a shy, gauche-looking schoolgirl" into a "modern young trend-setter." She wrote: "...[Périer] tried to open my mind and help me in all domains with his characteristic generosity. For example, he taught me to love the cinema by bringing me to see great films, and under his tutelage I realized the importance of aesthetics, which became one of my major criteria. He taught me how to carry myself and to dress, and gave me advice on social skills". He persuaded the singer to begin modelling and she soon became "a star of the international fashion world as well as the French music scene." She was also notably photographed by Gered Mankowitz, William Klein and Richard Avedon for Vogue and other publications. Her regular appearance on magazine covers gave her the reputation of being the quintessential French cover girl of the 1960s. In 1967, teen magazine Special Pop wrote: "Françoise manages to attract both kids and their parents, men and women alike. More than a singer, she's becoming a universal myth with whom thousands of young girls dream of identifying." Nevertheless, she was disenchanted with the lifestyle of the jet-set and high society, and in the 1970s abandoned the image of "fashionable young girl about town" that Périer had created for her.

An "it girl" and fashion icon, Hardy was considered the epitome of "the 'Modern Woman'" and of 1960s French chic and cool, known for her avant-garde and futuristic fashion choices. Brett Marie of PopMatters noted that "her sense of style and '60s-era model figure made her as much an icon of fashion as a music-business star." She recalled in 2008: "At the start of the 1960s, all of a sudden, my slender build, which made me so self-conscious, became fashionable." The singer began to be regarded as an "égérie" 'muse' by the top French fashion designers of the time, including André Courrèges, Chanel and Yves Saint Laurent. Hardy championed the first incarnation of Saint-Laurent's rupturist 1966 design Le Smoking. The designer recalled the time he took the singer to the Paris Opera dressed in one of his tuxedos: "People screamed and hollered. It was an outrage". She was also an early fan of Paco Rabanne, earning the Spanish designer popularity by wearing his creations for both photoshoots and television performances. Her 1968 photographs wearing a golden, metal minidress by Paco Rabanne—dubbed "the most expensive dress in the world" at the time— are now considered "legendary" and "perhaps her most iconic look". In 1968, Hardy told a reporter that: "If it weren't for the way I dress, no one would notice me". Likewise, she told Vanity Fair in 2018: "My songs had little interest compared to the Anglo-Saxon production. So I took it to heart to dress well every time I went to London or New York. I was above all a fashion ambassador."  Hardy also modelled the creations of the nascent prêt-à-porter industry, a new wave of French female designers known as the "yé-yé school" or "the stylistes", who rebelled against the "strictures of haute couture". For instance, she helped launch the career of Sonia Rykiel by wearing her influential "poor boy sweater" on the cover of Elle, and was photographed by David Bailey wearing Emmanuelle Khanh's color-blocking coat for Vogue. Fashion Institute of Technology's Colleen Hill considers Hardy's style to be the most enduring out of all the yé-yé girls, noting that "her nonchalance is an important part of her appeal. Hardy's fashion choices, such as her white Courrèges pantsuits and Yves Saint Laurent's first Le Smoking, are distinctly '60s and streamlined, yet they also have an edge." In addition to high-fashion ensembles, Hardy was known for her pared-down style, with discreet hairdos and makeup, and often wearing a simple sweater and pants combination. Her signature look was defined by her famous bangs and use of white boots by Courrèges and miniskirts, considered one of the first people to wear the latter. She also regularly experimented with androgynous silhouettes.  As such, she has been described as the "anti-Bardot", imposing a beauty ideal that "rendered the exaggerated femininity of the sex-kitten of the time old-fashioned".

In the second half of the decade, Hardy became a pop icon and was consequently made a muse by numerous creative people. She was the subject of portraits by artists Michel Bourdais, Bernard Buffet, Gabriel Pasqualini and Jean-Paul Goude. In 1965, Jacques Prévert wrote a poem dedicated to the singer titled Une plante verte, which was read as part of Hardy's performance at the Olympia. She was also the subject of a poem by Manuel Vázquez Montalbán and an open letter by Paul Guth. Belgian illustrator Guy Peellaert used Hardy as a model for the title character of his 1968 pop art and psychedelic-inspired comic Pravda la Survireuse, made in collaboration with French screenwriter Pascal Thomas. The singer was admired by Spanish artist Salvador Dalí, who invited her to spend a whole week with him in Cadaqués in 1968. Outside of France, Hardy was also regarded as an icon in the Swinging London scene. She acknowledges to having been a "source of fascination for the English pop musicians" during that time. Malcolm McLaren described her as the "utmost of the pinup girl, pinned to the walls of every trendy pop apprentice's bedroom down in Chelsea. Many bands in their prime, like the Beatles or the Stones, dreamt of dating her." Her image fascinated the young David Bowie, Mick Jagger (who described her as his "ideal woman"), Brian Jones, Morrissey, and Richard Thompson. Bob Dylan was notably infatuated by the singer and included a beat poem dedicated to her on the back cover of his 1964 album Another Side of Bob Dylan. It begins: "for françoise hardy/at the seine's edge/a giant shadow/of notre dame/seeks t' grab my foot/sorbonne students/whirl by on thin bicycles/swirlin' lifelike colors of leather spin..." In 2018, Hardy told Uncut that two Americans had sent her several drafts of the poem that Dylan had left in a café, stating: "... I was very moved. This was a young man, a very romantic artist, who had a fixation on somebody only from a picture. You know how very young people are... I realised it had been very important for him." Hardy and Dylan only met in May 1966, behind the scenes of his performance at the Olympia. Noticing that Hardy was among the concert's audience, Dylan refused to go back on stage to perform the second half unless she went to his dressing room. She and other singers later joined Dylan at his suite in the Four Seasons Hotel George V, where he gifted her early pressings of "Just Like a Woman" and "I Want You".

Legacy and influence

Hardy is celebrated as a "French national treasure" and one of the greatest figures in French music of all time. She is one of the best-selling music artists in French history, with over 7.6 million records sold as of November 2017. American critic Richie Unterberger described her as "indisputably the finest pop-rock artist to emerge from that country in the 1960s." He also listed the singer as one of the artists he would like to be inducted in the Rock and Roll Hall of Fame. In 2011, an entry of Hardy was included in Le Petit Larousse Illustré.

Long after her heyday in the 1960s, Hardy continues to be regarded as an iconic and influential figure in fashion history. During his time at Balenciaga, designer Nicolas Ghesquière described her in Vogue as "the very essence of French style". The iconic photographs of the singer wearing a Paco Rabanne metal plated dress inspired Lizzy Gardiner's design of both the costumes of Priscilla, Queen of the Desert and her own Oscars dress. Hardy was a muse to Japanese designer Rei Kawakubo, who named her label Comme des Garçons after a lyric in the song "Tous les garçons et les filles".

Over her career, Hardy has amassed a large fanbase among gay men and is regarded as a gay icon by the community, declaring on several occasions that "her most devoted friends and fans are gay".

Hardy's musical influence is mostly found in the work of Francophone acts such as Coralie Clément, La Femme, Juliette Armanet, Melody's Echo Chamber, Keren Ann and Carla Bruni, who used Hardy as a blueprint for her musical debut. Writers have pointed to her influence on the music of English avant-pop group Stereolab, including similarities in Hardy's vocals and those of lead singer Lætitia Sadier. Outside the French-speaking world, she has also been mentioned as an inspiration to female singer-songwriters like Caroline Polachek, Charli XCX, Angel Olsen, Candie Payne, Erin Rae, Heather Trost, Violetta Zironi, Zooey Deschanel and Cat Power. Hardy has also been an influence to several alternative music acts, including Broadcast, Goldfrapp, Jeremy Jay, The Chap and Xeno & Oaklander. In an article for Into Creative, Filmmaker, Grant McPhee described her influence as an icon for Indiekids and hipsters 'A poster-girl for shy people and a fantasy figure for believing they too can be cool'  In 2021, Rivers Cuomo of American rock band Weezer cited Hardy as one of his "sonic ideals", particularly influenced by her album Message personnel. Greg Gonzalez of American dream pop band Cigarettes After Sex called Hardy one of his biggest musical influences, stating in 2016: "La question is just so perfect, I wanted that kind of beauty."

Her hit songs "Tous les garçons et les filles", "Le temps de l'amour", "Comment te dire adieu", "Message personnel", "Mon amie la rose", "L'amitié" and "La question" have appeared in several critcs' lists on the greatest French songs of all time. Her 1968 album Comment te dire adieu? was included in Rock & Folks list of "The Best Albums from 1963 to 1999", Les Inrockuptibles "50 Years of Rock'n'Roll" and Stan Cuesta's La discothèque parfaite de la chanson française. The 1971 cult album La question appeared in The Guardians "1000 albums to hear before you die", Gilles Verlant's "300+ Best Albums in the History of Rock", Christophe Conte's La française pop and Stan Cuesta's La discothèque parfaite de la chanson française. In 2017, Pitchfork ranked Tous les garçons et les filles ninetieth on its list of "The 200 Best Albums of the 1960s", with Marc Hogan describing it as "an enduring middle ground between rockabilly shimmy and Gallic introspection, delivered by the most glamorous wallflower in France." In 2023, Rolling Stone ranked Hardy at number 162 on its list of the 200 Greatest Singers of All Time.

Personal life

Family

In mid-1962, Hardy met Salut Les Copains photographer Jean-Marie Périer and they soon developed a romantic and professional relationship. The couple never moved in together and were constantly distanced because of their respective work obligations, which took a toll on the relationship. They broke up in 1966, but have remained close friends and collaborators ever since. Hardy began her much publicized relationship with fellow singer Jacques Dutronc in 1967. They had a somewhat distant relationship and did not live together until after the birth of their only child, son Thomas, on 16 June 1973. In the autumn of 1974, Hardy and Dutronc moved in together in a three-storey house near Parc Montsouris, with separate bedrooms. Every summer, the family moved to a house owned by Dutronc located in Lumio, on the island of Corsica. As an adult, Thomas Dutronc also developed a career as a musician.

Hardy and Dutronc got married on 30 March 1981 in a discreet ceremony away from the press. According to Hardy, they formalized their relationship for "fiscal reasons", stating in 1989: "I don't know if I should talk about this stuff but at the time, I had a little health problem and since I am of a hyper-anxious, hypochondriac temperament, I already saw myself in Heaven, or in Hell. So I had gone to see a lawyer to find out what would happen if something happened to me. And as a result, if anything happened to me, everyone had an interest in Jacques and I being married. That's why we got married. Stupidly! I have always considered marriage as an uninteresting formality." Having a troubled relationship, compounded by infidelities on both parts and Dutronc's alcoholism, the couple separated in late 1988. Nevertheless, they never got divorced and their relationship evolved into that of a "special friendship". In 2016, Hardy told Le Parisien that although Dutronc rebuilt his life with a new partner, it is he who does not want to divorce. She said: "One day, a long time ago, regarding another relationship, I told him he had to make a commitment. And that's when he said to me, 'I'll never get a divorce.' What do you want me to say?"

Hardy has discussed the intimacies of her family history in depth, including the tragic fate of her father and younger sister. In the early 1980s, she learned that her distant father led a double life as a closeted homosexual when one of his young lovers bragged about his financial support to one of Dutronc's friends. She wrote in 2008: "The revelation that someone is a homosexual is not shocking in itself, even if it is your own father, but the fact that at the age of almost eighty he was picking up young guys turned my stomach, despite the loneliness and suffering such degraded behavior implied." He died in hospital on 6 February 1981 after being assaulted, presumably by a young male prostitute, a cause that was not reported by the press at the time. Raised without the affection of their parents, Hardy's sister grew up to be suicidal, paranoid schizophrenic. In late May 2004, she was found dead at her home in L'Île-Rousse, possibly a suicide.

Health
Between late 2004 and early 2005, Hardy was diagnosed with MALT lymphoma, which inaugurated a "hellish period" that disrupted her life. The singer then underwent chemotherapy treatment that was initially successful. In March 2015, Hardy's condition worsened and she had to be admitted to the hospital, where she was put into an artificial coma and nearly died. During her hospitalization, the singer also broke her hip and elbow. That month, she told Le Figaro: "I am very isolated, very handicapped by illness. I was diagnosed with lymphoma over ten years ago. But it is especially in the last three years that my symptoms have worsened. I also have a lot of difficulty walking. (...) There are times when I absolutely cannot see anyone and I cannot go out. But I remain positive, I live from day to day, I have no choice, I avoid thinking about it, it does not obsess me." The singer then underwent further chemotherapy and immunotherapy sessions.

Her health has since worsened and in 2021 she made news as a proponent for the legalization of physician-assisted suicide in France, expressing her desire to have recourse to euthanasia. She told RTL's Flavie Flament: "It's absolutely appalling, but for the moment I'm reassured. I manage to cook for myself. As long as I can do that, okay! But if it does become even worse, if I am weakened to the point of not being able to do anything, I would seriously think about euthanasia. I cannot stay like this waiting for death to come, because I cannot live any more. I can't do the things that my life requires." She also disclosed her inability to continue singing as a result of the effects of the treatments.

Politics
As a public figure, Hardy is known for her frankness regarding her sometimes controversial political views, which have been described as right-wing. Raised in a Gaullist family, she told Télérama in 2011: "I kept that sensitivity. I don't like everything that is said or done on the right, and I don't denigrate everything that is done or said on the left. To be honest, basically I'm pretty centrist." In her 2008 autobiography, she claimed: "I only identify with ecology, which I absolutely believe is neither right nor left, but the fact I am not a puppet of the established authority will probably be enough to pigeonhole me."

In promotion of her album Décalages in 1988, Hardy was interviewed by the magazine Rockland in a conversation that branched off into political news, as the presidential election had taken place the day before. Believing that the off-the-record discussion would not be included in the final article, Hardy expressed her contempt for people on the left. Although outraged by the publication of the political conversation, Hardy defended her position on 13 May in a televised interview with Thierry Ardisson, in which she recounted an altercation with singer Renaud, claiming he had insulted her for her support of Minister of Culture François Léotard. In the Rockland interview, she also caused controversy with her statements about racism in France, claiming that: "we do not talk about anti-French racism, that there are places where you are more likely to enter if you are not French"; as well as antisemitism, suggesting that "those who see it everywhere could actually be sowing its seeds." The singer later distanced herself from these remarks, writing in her autobiography: "Since then, I have become more aware of the ethnic, social, and cultural differences that separate individuals. However, I still believe that the affinities of the heart and soul weigh more heavily on the scales and also have the marvelous power of transforming opposites into complementarities."

Hardy was a known opponent of the solidarity tax on wealth (French: impôt de solidarité sur la fortune; ISF). In 2010, she defended the tax shield put in place by the government of Nicolas Sarkozy and, in 2012, caused controversy when denouncing François Hollande's tax program amidst the presidential elections, telling Paris Match: "I believe that most people do not realize the tragedy that the ISF causes to people in my category. I am forced, almost 70 years old and ill, to sell my apartment and move out." This prompted her son Thomas Dutronc to write on Twitter: "But no mom, don't worry I'll invite you over to my place just in case...". Annoyed by the extent of her remarks, the singer later complained: "First, contrary to what has been written, I did not speak of the 'tragedy' of people who pay the ISF. The tragedy is the people who are losing their jobs because of offshoring and the crisis, and about whom we hear about every day in the newspapers. Then I never said I was going to be homeless. It's absurd. And even less that I was going to go into exile!"

Hardy has expressed her support for the legality of abortion, while at the same time distancing herself from feminism. She wrote in 2008: "It is better to forgo having a child if you are not able to supply the minimum resources and time required for it to develop into a healthy, balanced adult. (...) In contemporary French society, we hear a lot more talk about rights than we do their inseparable duties. This can be seen in how the feminist discourse has advanced the right of women to do as they wish with their own bodies, while passing over in silence — exactly like the puritan position — the fate of the children, although their fate should take precedence over everything else." In 2015, the singer caused controversy for her criticism of feminist activists in her essay "Avis non autorisés ...", in which she wrote: "I find them surly, ugly, that is to say not feminine for two cents. I have never been able to identify in anything with feminists. There are, however, some that I could have idealized..."

Amidst the 2017–2018 protests in France, Hardy expressed her support for President Emmanuel Macron, stating: "We must let him reform France. Part of the French people don’t want to see the reality and are stuck in the Marxist ideology. What I like about President Macron is that he is an idealist but not an ideologue and is firmly grounded in reality."

Discography

Filmography

Published works
Astrological
 Le grand livre de la Vierge (with Béatrice Guénin) (1979)
 Entre les lignes, entre les signes (with Anne-Marie Simond) (1986)
 L'astrologie universelle (1987)
 Les rythmes du zodiaque (2003)

Non-fiction
 Notes secrètes: entretiens avec Eric Dumont (1991) (interview)
 Le désespoir des singes... et autres bagatelles (2008) (autobiography)
 Avis non autorisés... (2015) (essay)
 Un cadeau du ciel... (2016) (essay)
 Chansons sur toi et nous (2021) (songbook)

Novels
 L'amour fou (2014)

See also

French fashion
French rock music
List of astrologers
List of baroque pop artists
List of folk rock artists
List of French singers
List of yé-yé singers

Footnotes

References

Bibliography

External links
  
 Françoise Hardy at Acclaimed Music
 
 
 Françoise Hardy at Discogs
 
 Françoise Hardy at Last.fm
 Françoise Hardy at the Official Charts Company
 Françoise Hardy at Rate Your Music

1944 births
English-language singers from France
Eurovision Song Contest entrants for Monaco
Eurovision Song Contest entrants of 1963
French astrologers
French astrological writers
Hardy, Francoise
German-language singers
Italian-language singers
Living people
Musicians from Paris
Reprise Records artists
Spanish-language singers of France
Virgin Records artists
Yé-yé singers